Newcombia philippiana was a species of land snail, a gastropod in the family Achatinellidae. It was described by Pfeiffer in 1850 and was endemic to Hawaii.

References

P
Extinct gastropods
Biota of Molokai
Extinct Hawaiian animals
Gastropods described in 1850
Taxonomy articles created by Polbot